The 2007–08 Women's CEV Cup was the 36th edition of the European Women's CEV Cup volleyball club tournament, the former Top Teams Cup.

Teams of the 2007–2008

Rules
When the two matches result in one win and one defeat for each team, the teams must play one extra set called GOLDEN SET. The Golden Set is to be played as a tie break set until 15 points. The team winning this GOLDEN SET will qualify for the next round regardless the results of the previous matches.

Play-off

1/16 Finals
1st leg  24–25 November 2007
2nd leg 1–2 December 2007
The 16 winning teams from the 1/16 Finals will compete in the 1/8 Finals playing Home & Away matches. The losers of the 1/16 Final matches will qualify for the 3rd round in Challenge Cup.

1/8 Finals
1st leg  11–13 December 2007
2nd leg 18–20 December 2007

1/4 Finals
1st leg  23–24 January 2008
2nd leg 29–31 January 2008

Final four
Belgrade, 15 & 16 March 2008

Semi-finals

Match 3/4

Match 1/2

Awards
Winners:
MVP:  Vesna Jovanovic (Rocheville Le Cannet)
Best Scorer:  Vesna Jovanović (Rocheville Le Cannet)
Best Spiker:  Christiane Fürst (Scavolini Pesaro)
Best Blocker:  Bojana Živković (Crvena Zvezda Belgrade)
Best Libero:  Nina Rosić (Crvena Zvezda Belgrade)
Best Setter:  Francesca Ferretti (Scavolini Pesaro)
Best Server:  Yuliana Kiseleva (Samorodok Khabarovsk)
Best Receiver:  Estelle Quérard  (Rocheville Le Cannet)

References

External links
 CEV Cup 07–08

2007–08
CEV Cup
CEV Cup